Lakeside Cemetery may refer to:
Lakeside Cemetery (Port Huron, Michigan), cemetery in United States
Lakeside Cemetery (Hamburg, New York), cemetery in United States
Carpenter, Lakeside, and Springvale Cemeteries, cemeteries in East Providence, Rhode Island, United States

See also
Lakeside Cemetery Chapel in Lakeside Cemetery, Wakefield, Massachusetts, United States